Midnight Robber is a science fiction bildungsroman (coming-of-age novel) by Jamaican-Canadian writer Nalo Hopkinson. Warner Aspect published the novel in 2000.

Plot
The novel moves between a first-person narrator and a third-person narrator who tell the story of Tan-Tan, the Robber Queen. She lives on planet Toussaint with her father Mayor Antonio and mother Ione. The Midnight Robber is young Tan-Tan’s favorite Carnival character, and she practices Robber Queen speeches and antics for hours at a time. Toussaint is a planet peopled by the descendants of Caribbean immigrants from Earth. Its society is technologically very advanced, with Granny Nanny, the ultimate A.I. guiding and directing the fate of humanity as a whole (or at least the citizens of Toussaint). Similarly, each person has "nanomites" injected into them at birth, which allow them to hear the voice of all the A.I. as needed. After killing Ione’s lover, Antonio escapes with Tan-Tan to an alternate world called New Half-Way Tree, a prison planet for exiles.

Life on New Half-Way Tree is much harder, a primitive and dangerous world inhabited primarily by Toussaint's exiled criminal class and the douen, an alien race reminiscent of creatures from Caribbean folklore. Here Tan-Tan is beaten and raped by her father Antonio. On her 16th birthday, she kills her father in self-defense. Aided by a douen, Tan-Tan flees from the human settlement to a douden tree-village. Soon, she realizes she is pregnant with her father's child. Hiding among the trees, Tan-Tan learns the secrets of the douen and gradually transforms into another figure out of Caribbean folklore, the Midnight Robber, who dresses in black, spouts poetry, steals from the rich, and gives to the poor.

Tan-Tan is kept on the run by Antonio's jealous widow, Janisette, seeking vengeance for her husband's death. When she discovers the secret douen village, the douens exile Tan-Tan and the young douen woman Abitefa. Tan-Tan seeks a new home, travelling between villages with her douen companion, continuing to act as the Robber Queen when the need arises. She is forced to flee upon seeing Janisette already looking for her, having followed the rumors of “Tan-Tan the Robber Queen.”

Tan-Tan arrives in a new town, looking for clothes to hide her pregnancy. She reconnects with her friend Melonhead, whom she was planning to partner with before she killed her father. Preparations for Carnival are underway, and Tan-Tan joins as a successful Robber Queen masque.

Janisette arrives in town, now driving a tank, and confronts Tan-Tan. Tan-Tan confesses everything in a Robber Queen speech, cowing Janisette and winning the adoration of the entire village. Melonhead wants her to stay, but Tan-Tan leaves to have her baby in the forest. It is revealed that a Toussaint A.I. makes contact to Tan-Tan’s baby, named Tubman.

Cultural references 

Midnight Robber (named after a Trinidadian traditional Carnival/Mas character) incorporates a number of characters and stories from Caribbean and Yoruba culture, including Anansi, Dry Bone, Papa Bois, Duppy, Obeah, J'Ouvert (from Trinidad Carnival), Tamosi (Kabo Tano), douens, and Eshu.

The planet on which Tan-Tan (Trinidad Carnival Character) is born is called Toussaint, after the Haitian revolutionary hero Toussaint L'Ouverture. The municipality where Tan-Tan's father is mayor is called Cockpit County, after a region in Jamaica. There is a statue of Mami Wata in the middle of the town. A local group of pedicab runners calls itself the Sou-Sou Collective, a reference to a West-African-specific form of credit union or collaborative. A nearby quarry is named Shak-Shak Bay. The company that landed the settlers on Toussaint is called the Marryshow Corporation, after T.A. Marryshow. The book also references Jonkanoo Week celebrations.

The planet Toussaint is regulated by the A.I intelligence called the Grande Nanotech Sentient Interface, which the locals nickname Granny Nanny, a reference to Nanny of the Maroons, a leader in the early 18th century guerrilla wars now known as the First Maroon War. 

The planet to which the main characters are exiled is called New Half-Way Tree, a reference to the Half Way Tree neighbourhood of Kingston, Jamaica. Settlements include Sweet Pone, named after a sweet potato dessert, and Chigger Bite. One of the native creatures has been named the "manicou rat" by settlers, which is a Caribbean term for an opossum.

Tan-Tan befriends a douen whose name is "Chichibud", a reference to a mento song by Max Romeo. Chichibud's partner is named Benta. In the end, Tan-Tan names her child Tubman, after Harriet Tubman.

Reception
Midnight Robber was nominated for a Hugo Award and shortlisted for the Nebula Award, the Tiptree Award, and the Sunburst Award.

Gary K. Wolfe praised Midnight Robber, characterizing it as "an inventive amalgam of rural folklore and advanced technology" and commending Hopkinson's distinctive narrative voice, which "reminds us that most of the world does not speak contemporary American middle-class vernacular, . . . raises questions about the highly conventionalized way that SF has always treated language, [and] mak[es] us question the hegemony of American culture in SF worlds."

Locus reviewer Faren Miller praised the novel, saying "Hopkinson take[s] potentially downbeat material and compel[s] the reader's attention with vigorous narrative, vividly eloquent prose, and forms of magic which may actually be SF."

References

External links

Novels by Nalo Hopkinson
2000 science fiction novels
2000 Canadian novels